"Get Closer" is a song by American soft rock duo Seals and Crofts, released as a single in 1976. The song is the title track of their eighth studio album, Get Closer. It reached No. 6 on the Billboard Hot 100 and No. 2 on the Adult Contemporary chart. Billboard ranked it as the No. 16 song of 1976.

In Canada, the song reached No. 19 on the pop singles chart. On the Adult Contemporary chart it was a major hit, reaching number one.

The song features vocals by former Honey Cone member Carolyn Willis. In 2004, the duo released a new recording of this song on their final album, Traces.  This version features vocals by their daughters, Juliet Seals Crossley and Lua Crofts.  

Jim Seals' brother England Dan had a top 10 song at the same time with "Nights Are Forever Without You".

Chart performance

Weekly charts

Year-end charts

References 

1976 songs
1976 singles
Seals and Crofts songs
James & Bobby Purify songs
Songs written by James Seals
Warner Records singles
Mercury Records singles